"Hymn From A Watermelon Pavilion" is a poem from Wallace Stevens's first book of poetry, Harmonium. It was first published in 1917, so it is in the public domain.

Poetic narrative

The dweller in the dark cabin may be understood to be the specifically poetical dreamer, like the old sailor in "Disillusionment of Ten O'Clock". Stevens enjoins him not to sleep in his dream, but rather to explore its riches. If the sleeper rises to do so, he will not waken, for he is still in the dream. The poem should be compared to "Anecdote of Canna". (In another vein, it can also be compared to "Of Heaven Considered As a Tomb", in which the poet exhorts "interpreters" to "Make hue among the dark comedians" and "Halloo them in the topmost distances" as he in this poem exhorts his addressee, a "dweller in a dark cabin", to "hail, cry hail, cry hail".)

Interpretation

Doggett interprets the poem differently, without imputing a dream world explored by the poet. The dweller is the self, and the dark cabin is the body. The dweller's "sense of reality is obscured as though in a dream, but beside [his] cabin is the vivid actual plantain of green reality and the sun".

Buttel comments on the poem's title. "How appropriate", he writes, "for Stevens' theme to infuse, by such imaginative conjoinings [American watermelon, French pavilion], the earthy, vigorous reality of America with the grace of French words. By such means he was able to be richly aesthetic without sacrificing vitality".

Notes

References 

 Buttel, Robert. Wallace Stevens: The Making of Harmonium. Princeton University Press, 1967.
 Doggett, Frank. "The Poet of Earth: Wallace Stevens". In College English (March 1961), Volume 22, Number 6.

1917 poems
American poems
Poetry by Wallace Stevens